Anthony Semrani is an Australian former rugby league footballer who represented Lebanon at the 2000 Rugby League World Cup.

Background
Semrani was born in Australia.

References

Living people
Australian people of Lebanese descent
Australian rugby league players
Lebanon national rugby league team captains
Lebanon national rugby league team players
Rugby league hookers
Place of birth missing (living people)
Date of birth missing (living people)
Year of birth missing (living people)